Geo Tez is a Pakistani pay television news channel that was launched in 2013 by GEO network. It broadcasts in Urdu, and its programming consists of headlines aired every fifteen minutes with a mix of entertainment programs acting as fillers.

Geo Tez premiered its first Urdu-language animated series, Burka Avenger, which would later become viral both on the Internet and on television. The channel broadcasts short stories, breaking news, headlines and documentaries. It has replaced the defunct GEO English news channel, which has closed in October 2013.

Geo Tez was launched in the UK on Sky Digital in May 2013, and closed in August 2017.

Programmes
 Burka Avenger
 Doodh Patti Aur Khabar
 Tezabi Tottay

References

External links
 
 

  

Geo TV
Television networks in Pakistan
Television channels and stations established in 2013
Television stations in Pakistan
Television stations in Karachi